Harry Peter "Bud" Grant Jr. (May 20, 1927 – March 11, 2023) was a gridiron football player and coach in the National Football League (NFL) and Canadian Football League (CFL). Grant is best known for serving as the head coach of the NFL's Minnesota Vikings for 18 seasons; he was the team's second (1967–83) and fourth (1985) head coach, leading them to four Super Bowl appearances, 11 division titles, one league championship and three National Football Conference championships.

Grant attended the University of Minnesota and was a three-sport athlete, in football, basketball, and baseball. After college he played for the Minneapolis Lakers of the National Basketball Association (NBA), the Philadelphia Eagles of the NFL, and the Winnipeg Blue Bombers of the CFL. A statue of Grant stands in front of the Winnipeg Blue Bombers' current stadium, IG Field. With the Lakers he won the 1950 NBA Finals.

Before coaching the Vikings, he was the head coach of Winnipeg for ten seasons, winning the Grey Cup four times. Grant is the most successful coach in Vikings history, and the fifth most successful professional football coach overall with a combined 286 wins in the NFL and CFL. Grant was elected to the Canadian Football Hall of Fame in 1983 and to the Pro Football Hall of Fame in 1994.  He was the first coach to guide teams to both the Grey Cup and the Super Bowl, the only other being Marv Levy.

Early life 
Grant was born on May 20, 1927, in Superior, Wisconsin, to Harry Peter Sr. and Bernice Grant. His mother called him "Buddy Boy", which later became "Bud". As a child, Grant was diagnosed with poliomyelitis and a doctor suggested he become active in sports to strengthen his weakened leg muscles over time. He started with baseball, adding basketball and football as he got older. Due to a lack of organized school teams, he arranged football games between neighborhoods and contacted kids from other schools to participate. During weekends, he spent time outdoors alone hunting rabbits. In his late teens and college years, he played organized baseball in Minnesota and Wisconsin.

In 1940, Grant and two friends were duck hunting on Yellow Lake in northern Wisconsin when the Armistice Day Blizzard occurred.  Grant survived by sheltering at a gas station while his friends were at a farmer's house.

Playing career

High school and college 
Grant played football, basketball, and baseball at Superior High School. He graduated from high school in 1945 and enlisted in the U.S. Navy during World War II. He was assigned to the Great Lakes Naval Training Station in Illinois and played on the football team coached by Paul Brown. Using an acceptance letter from the University of Wisconsin–Madison to be discharged from the service, Grant decided to attend the University of Minnesota instead. He was a three-sport, nine-letterman athlete in football, basketball, and baseball for the Minnesota Golden Gophers, earning All-Big Ten Conference honors in football twice. While at the University of Minnesota, Grant was a member of the Phi Delta Theta fraternity.

Professional basketball 
After leaving the University of Minnesota, Grant was selected in both the NFL and NBA Draft. He was selected in the first round (14th overall) of the 1950 NFL Draft by the Philadelphia Eagles and fourth round (47th overall) selection of the Minneapolis Lakers in the 1950 NBA draft. He played 35 games during the 1949–50 NBA season and signed with the Lakers for the 1950–51 NBA season. He chose to continue his basketball career with the Lakers because they were local and because he was offered a raise to stay for the season. Grant's close friend Sid Hartman was the Lakers' general manager, which may have influenced his decision to remain with the team. He averaged 2.6 points per game in his two seasons as a reserve with the Lakers and was a member of the 1950 championship team. After the death of Arnie Ferrin in 2022, he became the oldest living NBA champion.

Professional football 
After two seasons in the NBA, Grant decided to end his professional basketball career. He contacted the Philadelphia Eagles of the NFL and agreed to play for the team during the 1951 NFL season. In his first season with the Eagles, Grant played as a defensive end and led the team in sacks (an unofficial statistic at the time). He switched to offense as a wide receiver for his second season with the club and ranked second in the NFL for receiving yardage, with 997 yards on 56 catches, including seven touchdowns.

Grant's contract expired at the end of the 1952 NFL season and the Eagles refused to pay him what he thought he was worth. The Winnipeg Blue Bombers of the CFL had been interested in Grant while in college. Grant left for Winnipeg, Manitoba in 1953 and became the first professional player to "play out his option" and leave for another team. He played for the Blue Bombers until 1956 as an offensive end and was named a Western Conference all-star three times. He led the Western Conference in pass receptions for the 1953, 1954, and 1956 seasons and receiving yards for the 1953 and 1956 seasons. He also holds the distinction of having made five interceptions in a playoff game, played on October 28, 1953, which is a record in all of professional football. The Blue Bombers played for the Grey Cup in 1953, but lost to the Hamilton Tiger-Cats in the 41st Grey Cup game.

Coaching career

Winnipeg Blue Bombers 
Blue Bombers management decided that they needed a new coach prior to the 1957 season. On January 30, 1957, Grant accepted the Blue Bombers head coaching position after impressing management with his ability to make adjustments on offense and defense as a player. Club president J. T. Russell thought that Grant could coach even though nobody else did. Grant remained the head coach of the Blue Bombers until 1966. At age 29 (he was 30 by the time he coached his first game), Grant became the youngest head coach in CFL history.

During his ten seasons as head coach in Winnipeg, he led the team to six Grey Cup appearances winning the championship four times in 1958, 1959, 1961, and 1962. He finished his Blue Bombers coaching career with a regular season record of 105 wins, 53 losses, and two ties and an overall record of 122 wins, 66 losses, and 3 ties. Grant was the CFL Coach of the Year in 1965. Grant took on additional responsibilities as a club manager between 1964 and 1966. Max Winter, the Minnesota Vikings founder, contacted Grant in 1961 and asked him to coach the new NFL expansion team. Grant declined the offer and remained in Winnipeg until 1967 when Winter and General Manager Jim Finks were successful in luring Grant to Minnesota.

Minnesota Vikings 

The Minnesota Vikings hired Grant as their head coach on March 11, 1967, taking over from their original coach, Norm Van Brocklin.

Over his tenure as Vikings head coach, Grant was known for instilling discipline in his teams and displaying a lack of emotion during games. He believed that football is a game of controlled emotion and teams would not follow the coach's lead if he were to panic or lose his poise during the course of a game. He required his team to stand at attention in a straight line during the entire national anthem played before the game and even had national anthem practice. Grant required outdoor practice during the winter to get players used to the cold weather and did not allow heaters on the sidelines during games. As per the latter practice  it goes that Grant posited that with the heaters present on the sidelines the players would gather around the source of the warmth but if the heaters were not present the players would be paying attention to the game.

In his second year, Grant led the team to a divisional championship and his first NFL playoffs appearance. In 1969, he led the team to its first NFL Championship and their first appearance in the Super Bowl. The Vikings lost in Super Bowl IV to the American Football League champion Kansas City Chiefs. Prior to the 1970 season, Minnesota released Joe Kapp. After starting Gary Cuozzo at quarterback in 1970 and 1971, the Vikings re-acquired Fran Tarkenton prior to the 1972 season. During the 1970s, the Vikings appeared in three more Super Bowls (VIII, IX, and XI) under Grant and lost each one, but he was the first coach to lead a team to four Super Bowl appearances. He retired after the 1983 NFL season and was succeeded by Les Steckel, who led the team to a 3–13 record the following season. Steckel was fired as head coach after the 1984 season and Grant returned as coach for the Vikings in 1985. After one season where he returned the club to a 7–9 record, he stepped down again. Grant retired as the eighth most successful coach in NFL history with an overall record of 161 wins, 99 losses, and 5 ties. As of 2021, he also remains the most successful coach in Vikings history. During his tenure with the Vikings, he led the Vikings to four Super Bowl games, 11 division titles, one league championship, and three NFC championships.

Grant was the first coach to lead his teams to both a Grey Cup and a Super Bowl, with the only other one being Marv Levy.

Career statistics

Basketball

College
Source

NBA
Source

Regular season

Playoffs

Football

NFL

Regular season

Head coaching record
Source

* The 1982 NFL season was shortened to nine games due to a players' strike.

Post-coaching career 
After retiring, Grant became a less prominent public figure and focused on hunting and fishing as well as supporting environmental reforms. He was a spokesperson against Native American hunting and fishing treaty rights in Minnesota. In 1993, Grant's efforts resulted in a death threat. In 2005, he spoke at a Capitol rally in Minnesota for the conservation of wetlands, wetland wildlife, and water. Grant addressed 5,000 supporters, saying, "In this legislative session, we want to see some action. It's more important than any stadium they could ever build in this state." In 1983, Grant was inducted into the Canadian Football Hall of Fame and in 1994, he would be inducted into the Pro Football Hall of Fame by Sid Hartman, who was by then a senior Minnesota sports columnist.

Until his death, Grant was still listed as a consultant for the Vikings and maintained an office at the team's headquarters at TCO Performance Center in Eagan, Minnesota.

In 2014, the Winnipeg Blue Bombers unveiled a statue of Coach Grant outside IG Field. In 2016, Grant was inducted into the Blue Bomber ring of honour.

Personal life and death 
Bud married Pat (née Patricia Nelson; born March 28, 1927) in 1950, and they had six children (Kathy, Laurie, Peter, Mike, Bruce, and Danny). Bruce died July 25, 2018, from brain cancer. Mike started coaching in 1979 at Minnetonka High School, then became the Forest Lake head coach from 1981 to 1986 and 1989 to 1991. In between those stints, Mike served as the Saint John's (Minnesota) offensive coach in 1987 and 1988. Mike has been the football head coach for Eden Prairie High School in Eden Prairie, Minnesota since 1992. Mike Grant has coached Eden Prairie to 11 state championships since he began his tenure at the school. Bud Grant's grandson Ryan Grant was a quarterback and linebacker at Eden Prairie and played at the University of Minnesota (2008–2012) as a linebacker. Bud's granddaughter Jenny is married to former NFL quarterback Gibran Hamdan.

Pat Grant died of Parkinson's disease on March 4, 2009, at age 81.

Bud Grant died at home in Bloomington, Minnesota, on March 11, 2023, at age 95.

Coaching tree 
As of 2020, seven of Grant's assistants have become head coaches, and one has won the Super Bowl.

 Pete Carroll, Seattle Seahawks (2010–present), New England Patriots (1997–1999), New York Jets (1994)
 Marc Trestman, Chicago Bears (2013–2014), Canadian Football League, Montreal Alouettes (2008–2012), Toronto Argonauts (2017–2018)
 Jerry Burns, Minnesota Vikings (1986–1991)
 Les Steckel, Minnesota Vikings (1984)
 Neill Armstrong, Chicago Bears (1977–1981)
 Jack Patera, Seattle Seahawks (1976–1982)
 Bob Hollway, St. Louis Cardinals (1971–1972)

See also
 List of National Football League head coach wins leaders
 List of professional gridiron football coaches with 200 wins

References

Further reading 
 Bruton, Jim; Grant, Bud. I Did It My Way: A Remarkable Journey to the Hall of Fame, published by Triumph Books, 2013,

External links
 
 Coaching stats at cfldb.ca

1927 births
2023 deaths
American football wide receivers
American men's basketball players
American players of Canadian football
Baseball players from Wisconsin
Basketball players from Wisconsin
Canadian Football Hall of Fame inductees
Canadian football offensive linemen
Forwards (basketball)
Manitoba Sports Hall of Fame inductees
Military personnel from Wisconsin
Minneapolis Lakers draft picks
Minneapolis Lakers players
Minnesota Golden Gophers baseball players
Minnesota Golden Gophers football players
Minnesota Golden Gophers men's basketball players
Minnesota Vikings head coaches
Philadelphia Eagles players
Players of American football from Wisconsin
Pro Football Hall of Fame inductees
Sportspeople from Superior, Wisconsin
United States Navy personnel of World War II
United States Navy sailors
Winnipeg Blue Bombers coaches
Winnipeg Blue Bombers general managers
Winnipeg Blue Bombers players